Scouting in Prince Edward Island has a long history, from the 1900s to the present day, serving thousands of youth in programs that suit the environment in which they live.

Anglophone Scouting in Prince Edward Island

Prince Edward Island is administered by the Prince Edward Island Council of Scouts Canada.

National Jamborees

 CJ'77, 1977: 4th Canadian Scout Jamboree, Cabot Beach Provincial Park, Prince Edward Island. 16,000 attend.
 CJ'89, 1989: 7th Canadian Scout Jamboree, Port-la-Joye–Fort Amherst, Prince Edward Island. 10,000 attend.
 CJ'01, 2001: 10th Canadian Scout Jamboree, Cabot Beach Provincial Park, Prince Edward Island. 14,000 attend.

Camps

 Camp Buchan (summer, fall, winter)

Francophone Scouting in Prince Edward Island

Girl Guiding in Prince Edward Island

Guiding is served by the Guiding in Canada - Prince Edward Island Council.

Guiding started in Prince Edward Island in 1923.

Headquarters: Charlottetown
Website: http://www.girlguides.pe.ca/

Camps:

See also

External links
 Prince Edward Island Council
 Guiding in Canada - Prince Edward Island Council

Scouting and Guiding in Canada
Culture of Prince Edward Island